Cities Built on Sand is the first released EP by American post-hardcore group VersaEmerge. It was independently released in 2007. This EP featured their previous vocalist Spencer Pearson.

Track list

2007 EPs
Experimental rock EPs
Versa (band) EPs